"No Thunder, No Fire, No Rain" is a song by New Zealand musician, Tim Finn, released in April 1986 as the lead single from his second studio album, Big Canoe. The song reached number 24 on the New Zealand charts and number 46 in Australia.

Track listing
Australian/New Zealand  7" single (VS 849)
A. "No Thunder, No Fire, No Rain" - 4:03
B. "Searching the Streets" - 4:02

Australian/New Zealand  12" single (VS 849)
A1. "No Thunder, No Fire, No Rain" (Extended Mix)
B1. "No Thunder, No Fire, No Rain" (7" Version)
B2. "Searching the Streets"

Charts

References

1986 songs
1986 singles
Songs written by Tim Finn
Mushroom Records singles